A lichen has lecanorine fruiting body parts if they are shaped like a plate with a ring around them, and that ring is made of tissue similar to the main non-fruiting body part of the lichen. The name comes from the name of the lichen genus Lecanora, whose members have such apothecia. If a lichen has lecanorine apothecia, the lichen itself is sometimes described as being lecanorine.

References

Lichenology